Denise Di Novi (born March 21, 1956) is an American film producer and director.

Early life
The daughter of jazz musician Gene DiNovi, when Di Novi was three years old her family moved to Los Angeles from New York, where her father made music for the TV shows of Danny Thomas, Dick Van Dyke and Andy Griffith. In the late 1960s, the family moved to Toronto, Canada.

Career
Di Novi studied communications at Simmons College in Massachusetts, and received a degree in journalism. After working as a copy editor at the National Observer and staff writer for Canada AM, she became a reporter for Toronto's Citytv, but quit in 1980, taking a job as a unit publicist for Final Assignment. She became a principal in the Montreal-based production company Filmplan International, acting in various production capacities on nine major studio releases, including Scanners (1981) and Videodrome (1983). In 1983, Filmplan relocated to Los Angeles and merged with Arnold Kopelson's Film Packages.

Di Novi joined New World Pictures as Executive Vice President of production. She later shifted into an overall deal as an independent producer, producing Heathers (1988) starring Winona Ryder. Di Novi then headed Tim Burton Productions and was responsible for producing several films. She set up her own production company, Di Novi Pictures, in 1993, at Columbia Pictures. She then entered into a producing deal with Warner Brothers Pictures.

Di Novi has produced 35 films. These include six from her partnership with Tim Burton, Edward Scissorhands (1990), Batman Returns (1992), The Nightmare Before Christmas (1993), Cabin Boy (1994), Ed Wood (also 1994) and James and the Giant Peach (1996). She produced four films based on books by Nicholas Sparks, Message in a Bottle (1999), A Walk to Remember (2002), Nights in Rodanthe (2008) and The Lucky One (2012).

For four years, Di Novi was executive producer of The District, a CBS primetime series created by Terry George. Di Novi made her directorial debut on the thriller Unforgettable (2017), for Warner Bros.

Filmography
She was a producer in all films unless otherwise noted.

Film

As director

Miscellaneous crew

Script and continuity department

Thanks

Television

As executive producer

As director

Thanks

References

External links
 
 Profile of Di Novi, Lukeford.net
 Profile of Di Novi, Filmbug.com
 Movieline 1994 profile article

1956 births
Living people
American film producers
American people of Italian descent
People from Sherman Oaks, Los Angeles
Simmons University alumni
Film producers from California
American women film producers
American women film directors
Film directors from Los Angeles
21st-century American women